Ranga SSLC is a 2004 Indian Kannada-language action comedy drama film directed by Yogaraj Bhat and produced by N. Kumar. Music was composed by Sandeep Chowta. It stars Sudeep and Ramya in lead roles. The film was later dubbed into Hindi as Ranga Dada in 2013.

Premise

Ranga, a autorickshaw driver, attempts to clear his SSLC exams, but in vain. His ongoing rivalry with Bomb Naga, who thinks that Ranga killed his son, takes a toll on his life.

Cast
 Sudeep as Ranga
 Ramya as Padma
 Daisy Bopanna as Sanjana
 Rangayana Raghu as Kunta Naga
 Bank Janardhan
 Umashree
 Vijay
 Maina Chandru
 Nagashekar

Soundtrack

The music is scored by Sandeep Chowta and was well received. All the songs' lyrics were written by V. Nagendra Prasad.

Awards

Karnataka State Film Awards :-
 Best Female Dubbing Artist - Deepa

References

External links
 

2004 films
2000s Kannada-language films
Films scored by Sandeep Chowta
Films directed by Yogaraj Bhat
Films shot in Kuala Lumpur
Indian comedy-drama films
2004 comedy-drama films